Pennsylvania Route 423 (PA 423) is a state route in Monroe and Wayne Counties in Pennsylvania. The route runs southwest-northeast through forested areas of the Pocono Mountains as a two-lane undivided road. In Tobyhanna, PA 423 has an interchange with Interstate 380 (I-380) and an intersection with PA 611. Farther northeast, the route crosses PA 196 in Gouldsboro. PA 490 was designated in 1928 to run from U.S. Route 611 (US 611) in Tobyhanna northeast to PA 90 (now PA 191) in Laanna. In the 1930s, the route was extended and realigned to run from PA 940 in Pocono Pines to PA 90 in South Sterling. PA 490 became PA 423 in the 1960s.

Route description
PA 423 begins at an intersection with PA 940 in the community of Pocono Pines. The route heads northbound as Warnertown Road, progressing around the shores of Lake Naomi. The surroundings of the highway are primarily residential. Just after the intersection with Firehouse Road in Pocono Pines, the road turns eastward along the westernmost shore of Lake Naomi. After PA 423 leaves the shoreline, it turns northward and continues through the residential hills north of the lake. The highway passes through a small community named Lake Naomi Estates. It soon passes a local school and leaves Lake Naomi Estates. The surroundings become woodlands as PA 423 darts northwest and soon to the northeast. The two-lane highway maintains the northeast progression through forests until turning north. There it turns eastward and returns northeastward for several miles and after several changes crosses Tobyhanna Creek and enters the community of Warnertown. Just after crossing the small community, PA 423 enters an interchange with I-380.

After crossing the interchange with I-380, PA 423 heads eastward and enters an at-grade intersection with PA 611 in Tobyhanna. The road is renamed to Prospect Street and enters downtown Tobyhanna, crossing through a residential stretch. At Main Street, Prospect Street ends and PA 423 turns northward onto Main Street. This does not last, as the designation darts northward on Church Street. Following Church Street out of downtown Tobyhanna, PA 423 crosses the Delaware-Lackawanna Railroad, passing the former Tobyhanna Station and interlocking tower for the switch to the Tobyhanna Army Depot. The highway continues north of the tracks and along the side of the Army Depot into a rural portion of Tobyhanna. The name changes from Church Street to Tobyhanna State Park Road, entering the namesake park near Tobyhanna Lake. PA 423 passes the dam attached at the end of the lake, where it crosses Tobyhanna Creek again, and crosses along the side of the park. After passing the state campground entrance, the highway heads eastward through a stretch of woodlands, crossing and passing two routes of power lines. After passing to the north of a large residential complex, the highway intersects with PA 196 in Gouldsboro.

After crossing PA 196, PA 423 changes names to Carlton Road and parallels PA 196 northbound along Kistler Ledge. After the two roads fork in different directions, PA 423 crosses the county line into Wayne County. The route passes a few stretches of residential homes and much woodland in Wayne County, turning to the northeast and intersecting with PA 191 in the community of South Sterling. This also serves as PA 423's northern terminus, as the right-of-way merges into PA 191.

History

When Pennsylvania first legislated routes in 1911, the present-day alignment of PA 423 was not given a number. In 1928, PA 490 was designated to run from US 611 (now PA 611) in Tobyhanna northeast to PA 90 (now PA 191) in Laanna. At this time, a small section northeast of Tobyhanna was paved while the remainder of the route was unpaved. In addition, the current route between Pocono Pines and Tobyhanna was an unpaved, unnumbered road. In the 1930s, PA 490 was extended southwest from Tobyhanna to PA 940 in Pocono Pines and was realigned to intersect PA 90 south of South Sterling. At this time, the entire length of the route was paved. PA 490 was renumbered to PA 423 in the 1960s.

Major intersections

PA 423 Truck

Pennsylvania Route 423 Truck is a truck route bypassing a weight-restricted bridge over Kistler Run. The route follows PA 940 and I-380 throughout Monroe County, Pennsylvania. Unlike many other truck routes throughout the state that were established in 2013, PA 423 Truck was signed in 2019 after the weight-restricted bridge on PA 940 had been repaired. As of March 2021, the bridge has no weight-restrictions over it, and construction on repairing the bridge was started around that same time. The route is still signed as of August 2022.

See also

References

External links

Pennsylvania Highways: PA 423

423
Transportation in Monroe County, Pennsylvania
Transportation in Wayne County, Pennsylvania